The A-5 is a semi-automatic pneumatic marker made by Tippmann for playing paintball. It is inspired by the look and feel of the Heckler & Koch MP5K submachine gun. It was first produced in 2002 in the United States. The A-5 utilizes a loading concept called the "Cyclone Feed System", which links the feeder sprocket to the air system for synchronized ball feed for reduced breakage and jamming. The Tippman A5 is the fully loaded model in the Tippman arsenal and costs more due to its built in features.

Features
The standard A5 is a semi-automatic, open bolt blow-back operated, sear-trigger paintball marker. Its inline blowback gas system can utilize both CO2 and HPA propellants. The standard marker includes a single-finger trigger, 8.5 in (216 mm) ported barrel, front and rear sights, tournament-legal velocity adjuster, opaque black 200-round wide-mouth hopper and Cyclone Feed System.

Caliber: 0.68
Action: Semi-automatic, or automatic (A-5 with E-Grip only)
Power: CO2, compressed air, and nitrogen
Feed rate: 15 bit/s (up to 30 bit/s with certain Cyclone upgrades)
Firing rate: 1-15 bit/s (Tippmann E-Grip ROF 8-30 bit/s auto)
Trigger: Standard
Barrel length: 8.5 inches
Length: 20 inches (with stock barrel on)
Weight: 3.5 lbs. (without tank)
Effective Range: 150+ ft

Cyclone Feed System

Tippmann A-5s use a special paintball feed mechanism called the Cyclone Feed System. It is similar to electric loaders in that it increases the rate at which the paintball marker can feed balls into the chamber.

Whereas most markers have a feed tube attached to a hopper/loader that either drops paintballs one-by-one or force-feeds (in the case of some loaders) into the chamber, the Cyclone Feed System is a housing on the right side of the marker. Contained within the housing are two star-shaped sprockets. Paintballs fall from a wide mouth hopper into the gaps between the spokes. As the operator fires, excess gas from the firing cycle is routed to a cylinder, which holds a piston. Gas pressure pushes the piston forward, also compressing a spring which will return the piston when the gas pressure in the cylinder drops; at far end of its travel, the piston is connected to a ratchet which interacts with a toothed gear, the advancement of which on the piston's return stroke (important because it regulates the force with which the paintballs are struck by the spokes) rotates the position of the spokes counter-clockwise and feeds a paintball into the chamber. This effectively means that the rate at which paintballs are being fed into the marker is dependent on the rate at which the operator pulls the trigger. Users have reported speeds in excess of 25 bit/s, but this requires mechanical modification to the stock cyclone parts. It is advertised at 15+ bit/s.

Modifications
The A-5 is one of the most modifiable paintball markers in existence. Some products are performance upgrades, while others are purely aesthetic. Kits available at many stores and websites can allow the A-5 to resemble many real-world firearms.

Some of the many upgrades include:

Barrels
Body kits
Camouflage kits
Compressed air low-pressure kits
Drop forwards
Remote lines
Electronic upgrades
Expansion chambers
Foregrips/false magazines
Hoppers (due to the unique Cyclone Feed System, very few hoppers [the stock hopper, Ricochet hopper, TAC-Cap loader, X-7 Marker Hopper, 240 round ammo box version, and a 450 Round Offset Hopper] are available); Q-Loader also manufactures a Q-Loader System for the A-5, although it typically requires the right receiver to be milled, unless a custom-manufactured attachment bracket is used.
Regulators
Stocks
Tactical shrouds
Triggers
A Tacamo magazine kit is available for preorder, which uses functional 18/20 round RAP4 T68 magazines.

The upgrades available from Tippmann specifically for the A-5 include the CAR Stock, Response Trigger, E-Grip, Low-Pressure Kit, Expansion Chamber, Universal Mount, 98 to A-5 Barrel Adapter, Remote Line, Sniper Barrel (12", 14", 16" lengths), Camouflage Graphics Kit, Longbow Stock (with or without air-thru), Dogleg Stock (with or without air-thru), Double Trigger Kit and Flatline Barrel System.

Flatline barrel system
The Flatline barrel is a curved paintball barrel. The slight "S"-shaped curvature, in addition to a roughly honed surface at select points in the barrel, creates topspin on the ball which increases its range by 100+ feet over a standard barrel. Some players feel that it is not quite as accurate as many other paintball barrels, because each paintball is spun differently. Another disadvantage some players claim is its tendency to break paintballs more easily. This can be remedied with higher quality paint, however. The Flatline is also quite loud, due to lack of porting.

Unfortunately, Flatline barrels are sometimes considered difficult to remove and clean, though it has been said that the A5 is much easier over the version used by the Tippmann 98 Custom.  On the 98 Custom model, they do not screw into the adapter on the muzzle of the marker; three bolts must be loosened before the barrel can be removed.

The Flatline is often favored by players who like to play farther back roles, especially those providing suppressive fire as the range gives them an advantage.

E-Grip
The E-Grip is an aftermarket pistol grip and trigger for the Tippmann A5, though the model A-5 with E-Grip can be bought directly from Tippmann. There are two types of electronic triggers now available.

There is the older and significantly harder to find Tippmann produced E-Grip. It features five different fire selections which include:
Semi-automatic fire
Full-automatic fire
3-round burst fire
Turbo fire
Auto-response fire

The maximum firing rate of the E-Grip is 20 balls per second. Firing modes are very easily selected by means of a screw which is rotated to toggle modes. Maximum rate of fire can also be changed via another screw on the grip frame.

There is also the newer E-Grip produced by Wicked Air Sports (W.A.S.). This is what is commonly sold now by Tippmann in their E-Grip package. This trigger will also be installed an all A-5 markers ordered with the E-Grip installed. Firing modes on the W.A.S. trigger are:
Semi automatic
Three shot ramping
Three shot full auto
Auto-response
Turbo

The "Three" in the "Three Shot Ramping" and "Three Shot Full Auto" programming modes refers to the trigger needing to be pulled three times before the full auto or ramping are activated. The first three shots in this will be semi automatic. This makes the trigger legal for certain competitions.

Programming the W.A.S. trigger is more difficult. There is a menu system that is controlled by the pressing both trigger and a small button on the front of the grip that can only be pressed with a tool. There is a small three color LED that outputs data by different patterns of blinking and LED color.

The trigger can be programmed more deeply than the older Tippmann E-Grip. Maximum firing rate is 30 balls-per-second but is usually programmed much lower. Dwell and Debounce is also programmable.

The W.A.S. board is also used in the Tippmann 98 line of paintball markers. However the polarity of the microswitch is reversed. Polarity can be changed by referring to the owners manual. The same board can be used in both markers.

Response Trigger System
The Response Trigger System is a firing system available for the A-5. The system uses a series of parts that are added to the marker to greatly increases firing rate for the marker. The system uses excess carbon dioxide or compressed air from the firing process to reset the trigger and sear with a pneumatic cylinder. The system can reset the trigger with only moderate pressure on the trigger. When this happens, the pressure of the finger can immediately pull the trigger back, creating "bounce", and firing again. This effectively gives the shooter the ability to fire at fully automatic speeds. As such, it has been banned at some commercial paintball fields.

Construction
Continuing the Tippmann tradition, the A-5 is very durable and features a solid cast-aluminum receiver with a high-impact shock absorbing endcap. The Tippmann A5 can take much abuse as all parts are tough. The exceptions to this are the Cyclone Feed System and the Response Trigger Kit, which both have lines that snake along the receiver and can be snagged easily.

The grip/trigger assembly, back plate and bottom-line hose (or direct Air Source Adapter) are held to the receiver by four push-pins that can be easily removed to allow easy field stripping.

Field stripping
Unlike previous Tippmann markers, the A-5 is very easy to field strip and clean. Tippmann says it can be field stripped in about 60 seconds. This is done by removing four push pins which hold the tombstone, endcap and grip frame in place.

To field strip an A-5 marker:
Depressurize the marker by partially unscrewing the propellant supply and firing dry to rid marker of any latent gas.
Remove barrel from marker.
Remove four push-pins (#1, #2, #3, and #4). Use pliers and lubricate with paintball marker oil if pins are difficult to remove.
Depress tombstone latch and pull tombstone to remove it from marker. Remove endcap and grip frame; make sure the velocity screw is screwed in past the aluminum housing, now the valve and bolt assembly will easily slide out the back of the marker.
Clean chamber and bolt assembly.
Lubricate o-rings with a few drops of paintball marker oil. Inspect all o-rings for signs of wear. Replace any o-rings that show signs of wear.
Reassemble marker and replace push-pins.
Without connecting to CO2, cock back the marker and dry fire to ensure it was reassembled properly.

Note: Be sure to clean any residual paint from the hopper area. If it builds up, it can increase the chance of chopping a ball in the future. Q-tips work well to clean the hopper area. Also remember to thoroughly clean the barrel.

Operation
The Tippmann A-5 uses an inline blowback system.

Propellant
Before gassing, cock the marker by pulling back the cocking handle (located near the front of the marker on the left side of the receiver). This pulls back the front and rear bolts and allows access to chamber while also ensuring that the valve is not being depressed by the rear bolt when the propellant supply is screwed in, which would result in a leak. A click should be heard. Release the cocking handle.

Screw a propellant supply (CO2, N2 or HPA) tank onto receiver or remote coil. Operator should hear a sound as marker becomes pressurized.

Hopper and loading
Press the manual-feed button (located to the right of the receiver, on the Cyclone Feed System) and check Cyclone Feed System for proper rotation of sprockets. It should be clean and free of debris.

Attach a compatible hopper to the marker by placing the mouth-end (male) of the hopper into the Cyclone Feed housing (female) and turning hopper until tab on mouth locks into corresponding hole in feeder housing. Hopper should be parallel with marker.

Open hopper flap and fill with paintballs (up to 200 for standard hopper). Close flap until it snaps onto hopper mouth.

Preparing to fire
Pull back on the cocking handle located on the opposite side of the marker from the cyclone feeder (this is only required once each time a propellant bottle is connected). Press the manual-feed button to force a paintball into the chamber.

Disengage safety by pressing the 'Push Fire' button located above the trigger on the right side of the grip frame. A red line on the left side of the button indicates when marker is ready to fire.

References

External links

Tippmann Pneumatics: A-5
The cyclone feed in action
YouTube Video of Cyclone in Action
Mechanical operation animation.
Tippmann Inline Bolt System

Paintball markers